Reddyanus assamensis is a species of scorpion in the family Buthidae.

References

assamensis
Animals described in 1888
Taxa named by Eugene W. Oates